Hydroid dermatitis is a cutaneous condition that occurs after contact with the small marine hydroid Halecium.

See also 
 Sea anemone dermatitis
 List of cutaneous conditions

References 

Parasitic infestations, stings, and bites of the skin
Invertebrate attacks